"Ain't Giving Up" is a song by British singer Craig David and British DJ Sigala. It is the fifth single from Sigala's debut album Brighter Days and the fourth single from David‘s sixth studio album, Following My Intuition. It was released as a digital download on 19 August 2016 by Insanity Records, Speakerbox Media and Sony Music. David announced it on his official Facebook account along with the release of the album.

Background
"Ain't Giving Up" was released as the "fourth" single, but this is actually Craig David's first "official" from his latest album, Following My Intuition, three previous singles was released before: "When the Bassline Drops", "Nothing Like This" with Blonde and "One More Time", was intended to be the "first" single from his upcoming album, those singles charted in positive positions on the UK Singles Chart. Sigala and David previously covered Wiz Khalifa and Charlie Puth's hit, "See You Again" on BBC Radio 1. The single debuted at number 29 on the UK Singles Chart, giving David his twentieth top 40 hit.

Track listing

Personnel
 Wez Clarke – producer
 Craig David – lead vocals, writer
 Bruce "Sigala" Fielder – producer, writer

Charts

Certifications

Release history

References

2016 singles
2016 songs
Craig David songs
Sigala songs
Songs written by Craig David
Songs written by Sigala
Tropical house songs